The Loyal Rangers, or Jessup's Loyal Rangers, was a volunteer regiment of Loyalists in the American Revolution established in 1781 by the amalgamation of several smaller units, including the King's Loyal Americans. They were commanded by Major Edward Jessup.

Since they were formed late in the war they served mainly a defensive role, being stationed in Yamaska, Rivière-aux-Chiens, Île aux Noix, and Dutchman's Point in present-day North Hero, Vermont near Alburg.

After the close of the revolution the regiment was disbanded and received grants of land from the British Crown in Upper Canada, now the province of Ontario, Canada: Edwardsburgh, Augusta, and part of Elizabethtown, now Brockville, on the St Lawrence River, as well as Ernestown, near Cataraqui (Kingston, Ontario).

See also
Upper Canada

References

External links
 The King's Men: Loyalist Military Units
 

Loyalist military units in the American Revolution
British American Army Rangers